The Hunchback of Notre Dame: Topsy Turvy Games is a game that was released in 1996 by Disney Interactive for Microsoft Windows and Game Boy. It was the second title in the company's GameBreak! series after GameBreak! Timon and Pumbaa's Jungle Games. Tiertex adapted the game for SNES, Game Boy, and Super Game Boy, which were published by THQ.

The video game was based on the film The Hunchback of Notre Dame and features a collection of mini games based on the Festival of Fools that includes a variation of Balloon Fight.

Gameplay
Mobygames describes the gameplay:

Critical reception
Coming Soon Magazine gave the game 87 out of 100, concluding "although Hunchback of Notre Dame was first designed for children, the game might appeal as well for adults with its remarkable design. Not only do the graphics look sterling, but also the soundtrack plays admirably with the original music from the film. At no time you will get bored in the game. The hilarious commentaries from the gargoyles will keep you awake, and even the loading sequences feature small animations. Rarely has a game for children been so well made, and no doubt it will be another smash hit for Disney Interactive". Entertainment Weekly described it as having less "charm and originality" than Savoy Pictures' The Adventures of Pinocchio, ultimately giving it a B-.

Electric Playground gave the game a score of 8 out of 10.

References

Video games based on films
Video games based on adaptations
1996 video games
Game Boy games
Video games developed in the United States
Video games set in Paris
Windows games
The Hunchback of Notre Dame (franchise)
Tiertex Design Studios games
THQ games
Single-player video games